Charles François (born October 4, 1986) is a French Muay Thai kickboxer. He is the W.P.M.F. European Muaythai Champion and former W.P.M.F. World Muaythai Champion.

Biography and career

Charles "Karlito" François is a pro Muaythai kickboxer and member of the France team of Muaythai.  He has competed for over 10 years and has received various titles such as Champion of France six times. He is also a two-time European champion, Intercontinental champion and a world champion in the discipline. He began Muaythai at the age of 12-13 at Muaythai Academy 57 in Metz, with his trainer Stéphane Leichtmann.

On February 17, 2012, François faced Yuta Kubo for the vacant ISKA World Light-Welterweight (64.5 kg) Championship in Tokyo, Japan but lost via knockout in the second round.

He beat Vang Moua by decision at Nuit des Champions in Marseille on November 24, 2012.

He lost a split decision to Petchasawin Seatransferry at Best of Siam 3 in Paris, France, on February 14, 2013.

He was dropped in round one and lost by unanimous decision to Lee Sung-Hyun at the K-1 World Max 2013 World Championship Tournament Final 16 in Majorca, Spain on September 14, 2013.

At La 20ème Nuit des Champions -68.5 kg/151 lb tournament in Marseille, France, on November 23, 2013, François lost to Abdallah Ezbiri on points in the semi-finals.

He is expected to face Bobo Sacko at Warriors Night on April 4, 2014.

On November 15, 2014 he faced the Thai Seemanut Sor Surinya losing by knockout first round at Z1 Royal Kedah event held in Langkawi, Malaysia

Three weeks later, he won his first fight at Lumpinee Stadium by unanimous decision against F16 Sor. Sakchai.

He fought for the IPCC 148 lbs title against Nauzet Trujillo. Charles lost the fight by a unanimous decision.

Francois fought Kaiss Najm during Fight And Furious 2. The match ended in a draw.

Titles and accomplishments

Titles:
2015 Emperor Chok Dee Champion -68 kg
2014 K1 I.S.K.A World Champion (65.000 kg)
2013 K1 I.S.K.A. Intercontinental Champion (65.000 kg)
2013 Explosion Fight Night 7 K-1 Rules Tournament Champion (65.000 kg)
2012 WMC World Muaythai Champion (63.500 kg)
2012 European Muaythai Champion (66.680 kg)
2011 W.P.M.F. Intercontinental Muaythai Champion (66.680 kg)
2011 Explosion Fight Night Volume 03 Tournament Runner Up (65 kg)
2010 W.P.M.F. World Muaythai Champion (67 kg)
2010 W.P.M.F. European Muaythai Champion (67 kg)
2009 French Muay Thai Class A Champion (67.500 kg)
2007 French Muay Thai Class A Champion (67.500 kg)

Kickboxing record

|-
|-  bgcolor="#c5d2ea"
| 2019-04-20 || Loss ||align=left| Kaiss Najm || Fight And Furious 2 || Marly-le-Roi, France || Decision (Unanimous) || 3 || 3:00
|-
|-  bgcolor="#fbb"
| 2018-11-24 || Loss ||align=left| Nauzet Trujillo || Golden K1 Tenerife || Spain || Decision (Unanimous) || 5 || 3:00
|-
! style=background:white colspan=9 |
|-
|-  bgcolor="#cfc"
| 2018-06-23 || Win ||align=left| Yoann Mermoux || Burning Series 7 || Bellegarde-sur-Valserine, France || Decision (Unanimous) || 3 || 3:00
|-
|-  bgcolor="#FFBBBB"
| 2018-03-30 || Loss||align=left| Mohamed Hendouf || The Main Event 6 || Levallois-Perret, France || TKO (three knockdowns) || 2 ||
|-
|-  bgcolor="#FFBBBB"
| 2017-08-26 || Loss||align=left|Liam Harrison || Muay Thai World Class Action In The UK || United Kingdom || TKO (three knockdowns) ||3||

|-  style="background:#fbb;"
| 2017-04-08|| Loss||align=left| Por.Tor.Thor. Petchrungruang || THAI FIGHT Paris || Paris, France || Decision || 3 || 3:00

|-  bgcolor="#FFBBBB"
| 2017-01-13 || Loss ||align=left| Yang Zhuo || Glory of Heroes 6 || Jiyuan, Henan, China || Decision || 3 ||  3:00
|-
|-  bgcolor="#FFBBBB"
| 2016-12-10 || Loss ||align=left| Armen Petrosyan   || VVWS - Venum Victory World Series|| Florence, Italy || Decision  || 5 ||  3:00
|-
! style=background:white colspan=9 |
|-
|-  bgcolor="#CCFFCC"
| 2016-05-19 || Win ||align=left|Lello Perego || Capital Fights || Paris, France || Decision || 3 || 3:00
|-  bgcolor="#FFBBBB"
| 2016-03-06 || Loss ||align=left| Sigitas GAIZAUSKAS || Max Muay Thai || Thailand || KO || 1 || 3:00
|-  bgcolor="#FFBBBB"
| 2015-08-22 || Loss ||align=left| Saenchai PKSaenchaimuaythaigym || Thai Fight || Thailand || KO (punch)|| 2 || 3:00
|-
|-  bgcolor="#CCFFCC"
| 2015-01-31 || Win ||align=left| Hamza Rahmani || Emperor Chok Dee || Nancy, France || Decision || 5 || 3:00
|-
! style=background:white colspan=9 |
|-
|-  bgcolor="#CCFFCC"
| 2014-12-05 || Win ||align=left| F16 Sor. Sakchai || King's Birthday || Bangkok, Thaïlande || Decision || 5 || 3:00
|-
|-  bgcolor="#FFBBBB"
| 2014-11-15 || Loss ||align=left| Simanoot Sor Surinya || Z1 Royal Kedah || Langkawi, Malaysia || KO (elbow)|| 1 || 2:30
|-
! style=background:white colspan=9 |
|-
|-  bgcolor="#CCFFCC"
| 2014-05-24 || Win ||align=left| Morgan Adrar || Ring's Tiger 3 || Chavelot, France || Decision || 5 || 3:00
|-
|-  bgcolor="#CCFFCC"
| 2014-05-10 || Win ||align=left| Sergio Wielzen || King of the Ring 3 || Longeville-Lès-Metz, France || Decision || 3 || 3:00
|-
|-  bgcolor="#CCFFCC"
| 2014-04-19 || Win ||align=left| Paolo Angelini || Kickboxing Day 6 || Villanova, Italy || KO (high kick) || 4 || 3:00
|-
! style=background:white colspan=9 |
|-
|-  bgcolor="#FFBBBB"
| 2014-04-04 || Loss ||align=left| Bobo Sacko || Warriors Night || Paris, France || Decision || 5 || 3:00
|-
|-  bgcolor="#FFBBBB"
| 2013-11-23 || Loss ||align=left| Abdellah Ezbiri || La 20ème Nuit des Champions, Semi finals || Marseilles, France || Decision || 3 || 3:00
|-
|-  bgcolor="#FFBBBB"
| 2013-09-14 || Loss ||align=left| Lee Sung-Hyun || K-1 World Max 2013 World Championship Tournament Final 16, First Round || Majorca, Spain || Decision (unanimous) || 3 || 3:00
|-
|-  bgcolor="#CCFFCC"
| 2013-03-16 || Win ||align=left| Mohamed Galaoui || Explosion Fight Night 7 ~65 kg K-1 Rules Tournament~, Final|| Châteauroux, France || Decision || 3 || 3:00
|-
! style=background:white colspan=9 |
|-
|-  bgcolor="#CCFFCC"
| 2013-03-16 || Win ||align=left| Calogero Palmeri || Explosion Fight Night 7 ~65 kg K-1 Rules Tournament~, Semi Final|| Châteauroux, France || Decision || 3 || 3:00
|-  bgcolor="#FFBBBB"
| 2013-02-14 || Loss ||align=left| Petchasawin Seatransferry || Best of Siam 3 || Paris, France || Decision (split) || 5 || 3:00
|-
|-  bgcolor="#CCFFCC"
| 2012-11-24 || Win ||align=left| Vang Moua || Nuit des Champions || Marseille, France || Decision || 3 || 3:00
|-
|-  bgcolor="#CCFFCC"
| 2012-05-05 || Win ||align=left| Panya Kemthong || King of The Ring || Longeville-lès-Metz, France || Decision || 5 || 3:00
|-
! style=background:white colspan=9 |
|-
|-  bgcolor="#CCFFCC"
| 2012-04-07 || Win ||align=left| Kichima Yattabare || Explosion Fight Night Volume 5 || Brest, France || Decision || 5 || 2:00
|-
|-  bgcolor="#FFBBBB"
| 2012-02-17 || Loss ||align=left| Yuta Kubo || Krush.16 || Tokyo, Japan || KO (punch to the body)|| 2 || 2:18
|-
! style=background:white colspan=9 |
|-
|-  bgcolor="#CCFFCC"
| 2012-02-11 || Win ||align=left| André Duarte || Kings of Muay Thai Act II || Differdange, Luxembourg || TKO (throw in the towel) || 3 || 
|-
! style=background:white colspan=9 |
|-
|-  bgcolor="#FFBBBB"
| 2011-12-30 || Loss ||align=left| Armin Pumpanmuang || Gladiator's War || Pattaya, Thailand || Decision || 5 || 3:00
|-
! style=background:white colspan=9 |
|-
|-  bgcolor="#CCFFCC"
| 2011-12-05 || Win ||align=left| Chang Shouy Youi || Kings Birthday || Bangkok, Thailand || Decision || 5 || 3:00
|-
! style=background:white colspan=9 |
|-
|-  bgcolor="#FFBBBB"
| 2011-10-08 || Loss ||align=left| Sak Kaoponlek || Muaythai Premier League: Round 2 || Padua, Italy || TKO (cut) || 3 ||
|-
|-  bgcolor="#FFBBBB"
| 2011-05-21 || Loss ||align=left| Armin Matli || Les Rois du Ring || Châlons, France || KO (left highkick) || 1 || 
|-
! style=background:white colspan=9 |
|-
|-  bgcolor="#FFBBBB"
| 2011-04-02 || Loss ||align=left| Houcine Bennoui || Explosion Fight Night Volume 03, Final || Brest, France || TKO || 2 || 
|-
! style=background:white colspan=9 |
|-
|-  bgcolor="#CCFFCC"
| 2011-04-02 || Win ||align=left| Alberto Siracusa || Explosion Fight Night Volume 03, Semi Final || Brest, France || Decision (unanimous) || 3 || 3:00
|-
|-  bgcolor="#FFBBBB"
| 2011-03-05 || Loss ||align=left| Kieran Keddle || Explosion Two: Aftershock || Swanley, England || Decision (split) || 5 || 3:00
|-
! style=background:white colspan=9 |
|-
|-  bgcolor="#CCFFCC"
| 2010-12-04 || Win ||align=left| Alexandre Boyancé || Thailand King's Birthday || Bangkok, Thailand || KO (right cross) || 2 || 
|-
! style=background:white colspan=9 |
|-
|-  bgcolor="#FFBBBB"
| 2010-10-29 || Loss ||align=left| Thanasak Top King Boxing || France vs Lumpinee || Paris, France || TKO (ankle injury) || 1 || 
|-
|-  bgcolor="#FFBBBB"
| 2010-09-11 || Loss ||align=left| Sak Kaoponlek || Iron Fighter || Pordenone, Italy || Decision || 5 || 3:00
|-
! style=background:white colspan=9 |
|-
|-  bgcolor="#CCFFCC"
| 2010-08-11 || Win ||align=left| Samson Sith-Ubon || Queens Birthday || Bangkok, Thailand || TKO (referee stoppage) || 3 || 
|-
|-  bgcolor="#CCFFCC"
| 2010-06-00 || Win ||align=left| Michelle Bottai || Muaythai Gala in Epinal || Epinal, France || TKO (referee stoppage) || 3 || 
|-
! style=background:white colspan=9 |
|-
|-  bgcolor="#CCFFCC"
| 2010-04-24 || Win ||align=left| Abdellah Ezbiri || Fightzone IV || Villeurbanne, France || Decision || 5 || 3:00
|-
|-  bgcolor="#CCFFCC"
| 2010-03-28 || Win ||align=left| Kraenkai Tor Silachai || France vs Thailand || Reims, France || Decision || 5 || 3:00
|-
|-  bgcolor="#CCFFCC"
| 2010-02-27 || Win ||align=left| Edgard Nzunga || Muaythai Gala in Ludres || Ludres, France || Decision || 5 || 3:00
|-
! style=background:white colspan=9 |
|-
|-  bgcolor="#CCFFCC"
| 2009-12-04 || Win ||align=left| Isae Ingram Gym || Kings Birthday || Bangkok, Thailand || TKO (doctor stoppage) || 4 || 
|-
|-  bgcolor="#CCFFCC"
| 2009-08-11 || Win ||align=left| Bird Kham || Queens Birthday || Bangkok, Thailand || TKO (knee to the liver) || 5 || 
|-
|-  bgcolor="#CCFFCC"
| 2009-06-11 || Win ||align=left| Bouba Konta || French Muaythai Championship || Paris, France || Decision || 5 || 3:00
|-
! style=background:white colspan=9 |
|-
|-  bgcolor="#CCFFCC"
| 2009-05-02 || Win ||align=left| Kraenkai Tor Silachai || France vs Thailand || Epinal, France || TKO (elbow/cut) || 1 || 
|-
|-  bgcolor="#CCFFCC"
| 2009-01-17 || Win ||align=left| Arezki Chayem || Les Rois du Ring || Ludres, France || TKO (gave up) || 4 || 
|-
|-  bgcolor="#FFBBBB"
| 2008-04-12 || Loss ||align=left| Boubou Traore || Le choc des mondes III || Saint-Amand, France || TKO (gave up) || 2 || 
|-
! style=background:white colspan=9 |
|-
|-  bgcolor="#FFBBBB"
| 2007-11-29 || Loss ||align=left| Mehdi Zatout || Gala in Coubertin || Paris, France || TKO (feferee stoppage) || 3 || 
|-
|-  bgcolor="#CCFFCC"
| 2007-10-00 || Win ||align=left| Boubou Traore || French Muaythai Championship || France || TKO (gave up) || 3 || 
|-
! style=background:white colspan=9 |
|-
|-  bgcolor="#CCFFCC"
| 2007-05-12 || Win ||align=left| Boubou Traore || Muaythai Gala in Epinal || Epinal, France || TKO (feferee stoppage) || 3 || 
|-
|-  bgcolor="#CCFFCC"
| 2006-05-13 || Win ||align=left| Jetmir Sula || Le Thaï Tournament II: France vs Thaïlande || Thônex, Switzerland || Decision || 3 || 
|-
|-
| colspan=9 | Legend:

See also
List of male kickboxers

References

1986 births
Living people
French male kickboxers
Lightweight kickboxers
Welterweight kickboxers
French Muay Thai practitioners